The 2003 season is the 81st season of competitive football in Ecuador.

National leagues

Serie A

Champion: LDU Quito (7th title)
International cup qualifiers:
2004 Copa Libertadores: LDU Quito, Barcelona, El Nacional
2004 Copa Sudamericana: LDU Quito, Barcelona
Relegated: Técnico Universitario, Manta

Serie B
Winner: Olmedo (2nd title)
Promoted: Olmedo, Macará
Relegated: Esmeraldas Petrolero, UDJ Quinindé

Segunda
Winner: LDU Loja
Promoted: LDU Loja, LDU Portoviejo

Clubs in international competitions

National teams

Senior team
The Ecuador national team played ten matches in 2003: four 2006 FIFA World Cup qualifiers, and six friendlies.

2006 FIFA World Cup qualifiers

Qualification for the 2006 FIFA World Cup began in 2003.

Friendlies

External links
 National leagues details on RSSSF
 National teams details on RSSSF

 
2003